Ivan Klíma (born 14 September 1931 in Prague, as Ivan Kauders) is a Czech novelist and playwright. He has received the Magnesia Litera award and the Franz Kafka Prize, among other honors.

Biography 
Klíma's early childhood in Prague was happy and uneventful, but this all changed with the German invasion of Czechoslovakia in 1938, after the Munich Agreement. He had been unaware that both his parents had Jewish ancestry; neither were observant Jews, but this was immaterial to the Germans.

In November 1941, first his father Vilém Klíma, and then in December, he and his mother and brother were ordered to leave for the concentration camp at Theriesenstadt (Terezín), where he was to remain until liberation by the Red Army in May 1945. Both he and his parents survived incarceration, a miracle at that time, as Terezín was a holding camp for Jews from central and southern Europe, and was regularly cleared of its overcrowded population by transports to "the East", death camps such as Auschwitz. The family adopted the less German-sounding surname of Klíma after the war.

Klíma has written graphically of this period in articles in the UK literary magazine, Granta, particularly A Childhood in Terezin. It was while living in these extreme conditions that he says he first experienced "the liberating power that writing can give", after reading a school essay to his class. He was also in the midst of a story-telling community, pressed together under remarkable circumstances where death was ever-present. Children were quartered with their mothers, where he was exposed to a rich verbal culture of song and anecdote.

This remarkable and unusual background was not the end of the Klíma's introduction to the great historical forces that shaped mid-century Europe. With liberation came the rise of the Czech Communist regime, and the replacement of Nazi tyranny with proxy Soviet control of the inter-war Czech democratic experiment. Klima became a member of the Communist Party of Czechoslovakia. Later, his childhood hopes of fairy tale triumphs of good over evil became an adult awareness that it was often "not the forces of good and evil that do battle with each other, but merely two different evils, in competition for the control of the world".

The early show trials and murders of those who opposed the new regime had already begun, and Klíma's father was again imprisoned, this time by his own countrymen. It is this dark background that is the crucible out of which Klíma's written material was shaped: the knowledge of the depths of human cruelty, along with a private need for personal integrity, the struggle of the individual to keep whatever personal values the totalitarian regimes he lived under were attempting to obliterate.

For his writing abilities, Ivan Klíma was awarded Franz Kafka Prize in 2002 as a second recipient. His two-volume memoir Moje šílené století ("My Crazy Century") won the Czech literary prize, the Magnesia Litera, in the non-fiction category in 2010. My Crazy Century was published in English in 2013 by Grove Press. Lisa Leshne of The Leshne Agency is Klima's literary agent.

Bibliography

A Ship Named Hope: Two Novels (1970)
Milostné léto (1972)
Ma veselá jitra (1985)
Moje první lásky (1985)
My Merry Mornings: Stories from Prague (1985)
Love and Garbage (Láska a smetí) (1986; English Translation 1990)
My First Loves (1986)
Soudce z milosti (1986)
A Summer Affair (1987)
Milenci na jednu noc (1988)
My First Loves (1988)
Už se blíží meče: Eseje, Fejetony, Rozhovory (1990)
Ministr a anděl (1990)
Rozhovor v Praze (1990)
Moje zlatá řemesla (1990)
Hry: Hra o dvou dějstvích (1991)
Judge on Trial (1991)
My Golden Trades (1992)
Ostrov mrtvých králů (1992)Čekání na tmu, čekání na světlo (1993)Judge on Trial (1993)Waiting for the Dark, Waiting for the Light (1994)*The Spirit of Prague and Other Essays (1994)My Golden Trades (1994)Milostné rozhovory (1995)Waiting for the Dark, Waiting for the Light (1995)Jak daleko je slunce (1995)The Spirit of Prague: And Other Essays (1995)Čekání na tmu, čekání na světlo (1996)Poslední stupeň důvěrnosti (1996)The Ultimate Intimacy (1997)Loď jménem Naděje  (1998)When I came home (1998)Kruh nepřátel českého jazyka: Fejetony (1998)O chlapci, který se nestal číslem (1998)Fictions and Histories (1998)Lovers for a Day (1999)No Saints or Angels (Ani svatí, ani andělé) (1999; English translation, 2001)Between Security and Insecurity (2000)Velký věk chce mít též velké mordy (2001)Karel Capek: Life and Work (2002)Premiér a anděl (2003)Moje šílené století ("My Crazy Century") (2009; English translation, 2013)

 References 

 External links 

Spisovatel Ivan Klíma převzal Cenu Karla Čapka, tomu i poděkoval (Lidové noviny) 
 "Optimism Outlasted a Lifetime of Horrors - Ivan Klima’s ‘My Crazy Century’ Spans Decades of Czech Life", The New York Times, 17 November 2013,
 Maya Jaggi: " Building bridges", The Guardian'', 1 May 2004,
 "Ivan Klíma: a sceptic in the era of entertainment culture", Czech Radio, 8. 11. 2009,

20th-century Czech novelists
20th-century Czech dramatists and playwrights
Czech male dramatists and playwrights
Czech male novelists
Czech Jews
Jewish novelists
Theresienstadt Ghetto survivors
1931 births
Living people
Writers from Prague
Recipients of Medal of Merit (Czech Republic)
University of Michigan faculty